Caloptilia tmetica is a moth of the family Gracillariidae. It is known from Papua New Guinea.

References

tmetica
Moths of Asia
Moths described in 1955